Chydarteres bicolor is a species of beetle in the family Cerambycidae. It was described by Fabricius in 1787.

References

Trachyderini
Beetles described in 1787